Shigeji Kaneko (Kaneko Shigeji, 13 August 1931 – 2 January 2016) was a Japanese featherweight boxer during the 1950s. He fought Gabriel "Flash" Elorde four times, winning them all. He was also a boxing promoter from the 1980s until the early 2000s.

Shigeji died from pneumonia on 2 January 2016 in Tokyo. He was 84.

References

External links
 

1931 births
2016 deaths
Featherweight boxers
Japanese male boxers
People from Tsubame, Niigata
Sportspeople from Niigata Prefecture
Deaths from pneumonia in Japan